Zegrze  is a village in the administrative district of Gmina Serock, within Legionowo County, Masovian Voivodeship, in east-central Poland.

The village has a population of 970. It gave its name to the nearby Zegrze Reservoir, a man-made lake constructed in 1963 with a hydroelectric complex producing 20 Megawatts of power, a popular place of recreation for the residents of Warsaw.

is the location of a historic palace built in 1847 by the noble Krasiński family, given as a dowry of Jadwiga Krasińska in 1862, to her new husband Prince Maciej Radziwiłł. The palace, surrounded by a park, serves as a convention centre and a small hotel.

In late 2019, Polish railway infrastructure manager PKP PLK called for tenders for the works required to reopen the line, with the intention of restoring a passenger connection with Warsaw from 2022.

See also
 Zegrzynek, birthplace of Jerzy Szaniawski nearby

References

External links
 Jewish Community in Zegrze on Virtual Shtetl
 

Villages in Legionowo County
Łomża Governorate
Warsaw Voivodeship (1919–1939)